Hayes is an English language surname. In the United States Census, 1990, Hayes was the 100th most common surname recorded.  The oldest record of the surname dates to 1197 in the Eynsham Cartulary of Oxfordshire, where it appears in the form Heise.  There are nineteen coats of arms assumed by or granted to individuals with this or a similar surname.  Though primarily a surname, "Hayes" sometimes appears as a given name in census records.

Origin

Derived from name of Irish god
In Ireland, Hayes originated as a Gaelic polygenetic surname "O hAodha", meaning descendant of Aodh ("fire"), or of Aed, an Irish mythological god. Septs in most counties anglicised "O hAodha" to "Hayes".  In County Cork, it became "O'Hea".  In the province of Ulster, it became "Hughes", the patronymic of Hugh, an anglicized variant of the given name Aodh. Hayes is noted on a public record in County Wexford as early as 1182. In County Cork, under the Munster providence, Hayes falls under the banner of the McNamara clan in the Dalcassian Sept.  Other Irish Hayeses have also been associated with Clan Cian, the ruling O'Carroll clan of southern Ireland.

Derived from place-name element

England
In England, Hayes arose as a locational surname, associated with one of the several places named or suffixed -Hay, -Hays, -Hayes, etc., such as those in Kent, or Middlesex. Such place names had two origins, one based on the Old English haes (brushwood, underwood) and the other based on horg (enclosure) or hege (hedge). The distribution of Hayes in Great Britain in 1881 and 1998 is similar, and restricted to areas of England well separated from Scotland and showing some penetration into Wales. This surname has gained in popularity in the century between 1881 and 1998, but remains at a rank below 150 and a frequency lower than that in the United States and some other countries of the Commonwealth.

Scotland
In Scotland, Hayes is a Scoto-Norman surname, a direct translation of the Normans' locational surname "de la Haye", meaning "of La Haye", La Haye ("the hedge") being the name of several towns on the Cotentin peninsula of Normandy, France. The first Norman namebearer to arrive in Scotland was William II de la Haye in the time of the Norman invasion. Clan Hay descends from him.

Other
Hayes also can derive from the Yiddish name Khaye, meaning "life".

Given name

Notable people with the surname
Listed here are people who share the 'Hayes' surname, organized by birth year, to assist in assembling a view of the geographic distribution of this surname over time.

Additional notable people
Brian Hayes (scientist)
Gregory J. Hayes (born 1960/61), American businessman, chairman and CEO of United Technologies 
Darren Hayes (born 1972), Australian singer and songwriter who rose to fame in 1996 as the frontman of Savage Garden
Geno Hayes (1987–2021), American football player
Helen Hayes (politician) (born 1974), British Labour Party politician, Member of Parliament for Dulwich and West Norwood since 2015
Hunter Hayes (born 1991), country singer and songwriter
Jimmy Hayes (born 1946), former member of the United States House of Representatives
Kate Simpson Hayes (1856–1945), Canadian writer, teacher, legislative librarian
Richard Hayes (professor) (born 1945), academic in the areas of Buddhist philosophy and Sanskrit
Robert Hayes, American fugitive also known as "The Daytona Beach killer"
Wade Hayes (born 1969), country singer

Fictional characters with the surname
Ainsley Hayes in the American television series The West Wing
Adam Hayes from the fiction podcast The Bright Sessions
Angela Hayes in the Academy Award-winning film American Beauty
Angela Hayes in the Academy Award-winning film Three Billboards Outside Ebbing Missouri
Ben Hayes in the 2005 American film remake of King Kong 
 Beth Hayes in the horror video game Slender: The Arrival
Blake Hayes in the American television soap opera The Bold and the Beautiful
Captain Hayes, a recurring villain of TV series Totally Spies!
Damian Hayes, character in Degrassi: The Next Generation
Emily Hayes in the graphic novel series Amulet
Harriet Hayes (or Hannah Harriet Hayes) in the American television series Studio 60
Henry Hayes in Stargate SG-1
Major J. Hayes in the third season of Star Trek: Enterprise
 Master Chief Special Warfare Operator Jason Hayes in the American television series SEAL Team.
Karen Hayes in the American television series 24
Lavon Hayes, in the American television series Hart of Dixie
 Lisa Hayes, a character in the American television sitcom Diff'rent Strokes
Lisa Hayes in the anime Robotech
Logan Hayes in the American television soap opera General Hospital
Maddie Hayes in the American television series Moonlighting
Michael Hayes in American TV series of the same name
Molly Hayes, a main character from the Marvel Comics series Runaways
Sally Hayes, character from The Catcher in the Rye
Farmer Michael Hayes in the Christy Moore song "The Pursuit of Farmer Michael Hayes"
Taylor Hayes in the American television soap opera The Bold and the Beautiful
William Hayes, the main character in the 1978 film Midnight Express
William Matthew Hayes, the main character in the film Definitely, Maybe
Willie Mays Hayes in the films Major League and Major League II

Distribution

As a surname, Hayes is the 191st most common surname in Great Britain, with 42,475 bearers. It is most common in Kent, where it is the 73rd most common surname, with 4,828 bearers. Other concentrations include, Buckinghamshire, (34th,3,304), Caerphilly, (43rd,1,700), Carmarthenshire, (48th,1,696), Merseyside, (79th,3,252), Swansea, (86th,1,704), City of Leeds (165th,1,722), Lancashire, (177th,3,370), Greater London, (288th,3,358), Greater Manchester, (335th,1,724), Cheshire, (386th,1,678), Essex, (618th,1,666), and Scotland. Other notable concentrations include, Tyne and Wear, West Yorkshire including, the City of Wakefield, Nottinghamshire, the City of Glasgow, Midlothian, Moray, Aberdeenshire, Banffshire, North Yorkshire, South Yorkshire including, the City of Sheffield, Darton, Kirkleatham, and the Highlands.

See also
, includes people not listed above
Billy Hayes (disambiguation)Brian Hayes (disambiguation)
Chris Hayes (disambiguation)
David Hayes (disambiguation)
Frank Hayes (disambiguation)
Jeremy Hayes (disambiguation)John Hayes (disambiguation)
Larry Hayes (disambiguation)
Mark Hayes (disambiguation)Michael Hayes (disambiguation)
Richard Hayes (disambiguation)
Sean Hayes (disambiguation)Stephen Hayes (disambiguation)
Thomas Hayes (disambiguation)
William Hayes (disambiguation)
Hays (surname)

Citations

General and cited references 

 Note: Attempts to link directly to search results pages result in failure to find the site.
United States Census Bureau (9 May 1995). s:1990 Census Name Files dist.all.last (1-100). Retrieved on 4 April 2008.

English-language surnames

ru:Хейз